Passiflora brachyantha is a species of plant in the family Passifloraceae. It is endemic to Ecuador.

References

brachyantha
Endemic flora of Ecuador
Endangered plants
Taxonomy articles created by Polbot
Taxa named by Linda Katherine Escobar